Qoridheere  is a town in the Aynabo District, in the Sool region of Somaliland.

See also

References 

Populated places in Sool, Somaliland